Paul Perry is an Australian racehorse trainer based in Broadmeadow, New South Wales. He is famous for winning the King's Stand Stakes and the Group One Golden Jubilee Stakes in the United Kingdom with Choisir.

References

Australian horse trainers
Living people
1949 births